Mallory Brooke Martin (born January 29, 1994) is an American mixed martial artist who competes in the Strawweight division. Martin also competed in the Ultimate Fighting Championship (UFC) and Invicta Fighting Championships (Invicta).

Mixed martial arts career

Early career
Martin started her professional mixed martial arts career in 2016 at Kunlun Fight MMA 7 in China prior to joining Invicta Fighting Championships.

Invicta Fighting Championships
Martin made her promotional debut on March 25, 2017, at Invicta FC 22: Evinger vs. Kunitskaya II against Sunna Davíðsdóttir. She lost the fight via unanimous decision.

Legacy Fighting Alliance 
Martin faced Maycee Barber on September 8, 2017, at LFA 22 - Heinisch vs. Perez. She lost the fight by unanimous decision.

Return to Invicta Fighting Championships
Martin second fight in Invicta was on January 13, 2018, at Invicta FC 27: Kaufman vs. Kianzad.  She faced Tiffany Masters and she won the fight via technical knockout in the second round.

Return to Legacy Fighting Alliance 
On April 27, 2018, Martin faced Linsey Williams  at LFA 38. She won the fight by submission in round two.

Second return to Invicta Fighting Championships
Martin returned to Invicta and faced Ashley Nichols on September 1, 2018, at Invicta FC 31: Jandiroba vs. Morandin.

At the weigh-ins, Mallory Martin weighed in at 117 pounds, one pound over the strawweight non-title fight limit of 116 pounds. Her bout proceeded at catchweight and she was fined 25 percent of her purse which went to her opponent Nichols. She won the fight via a technical knockout in round three.

Ultimate Fighting Championship 
Martin was signed by UFC in December 2019.

Martin faced Virna Jandiroba, replacing injured Lívia Renata Souza on December 7, 2019, at UFC on ESPN 7. She lost the fight via submission in the second round.

Martin faced Hannah Cifers on August 29, 2020, at UFC Fight Night 175. The bout was held at catchweight after Cifers missed weight with 20 percent of her purse going to Martin. Despite getting knocked down in the first round, Martin won the fight via a rear-naked choke in round two. This win earned her the Performance of the Night  award.

Martin faced Polyana Viana on February 13, 2021, at UFC 258. She lost the fight via an armbar in round two.

Martin was scheduled to face Montserrat Ruiz on December 4, 2021, at UFC on ESPN 31. However Ruiz was forced out of the event and she was replaced by Cheyanne Buys. 
 Martin lost the fight via unanimous decision. This fight earned her the Fight of the Night award.

After fighting out her contract with her last bout, she didn't re-sign with the UFC.

Post UFC 
Martin faced Katharina Dalisda on October 15, 2022 at Oktagon 36. She lost the bout via unanimous decision.

Championships and accomplishments
Ultimate Fighting Championship
Performance of the Night (One time) 
Fight of the Night (One time)

Mixed martial arts record

|-
|Loss
|align=center|7–6
|Katharina Dalisda
|Decision (unanimous)
|Oktagon 36
|
|align=center|3
|align=center|5:00
|Frankfurt, Germany
|
|-
|Loss
|align=center|7–5
|Cheyanne Vlismas
|Decision (unanimous)
|UFC on ESPN: Font vs. Aldo 
|
|align=center|3
|align=center|5:00
|Las Vegas, Nevada, United States
|
|-
|Loss
|align=center|7–4
|Polyana Viana
|Submission (armbar)
|UFC 258 
|
|align=center|1
|align=center|3:18
|Las Vegas, Nevada, United States
|
|-
|Win
|align=center|7–3
|Hannah Cifers
|Submission (rear-naked choke)
|UFC Fight Night: Smith vs. Rakić
|
|align=center|2
|align=center|1:33
|Las Vegas, Nevada, United States
|
|-
|Loss
|align=center| 6–3
|Virna Jandiroba
| Submission (rear-naked choke)
|UFC on ESPN: Overeem vs. Rozenstruik 
|
|align=center|2
|align=center|1:16
|Washington, D.C., United States
|
|-
| Win
| align=center| 6–2
| Cynthia Arceo
| Decision (unanimous)
| Invicta FC 38: Murato vs. Ducote
| 
| align=center| 3
| align=center| 5:00
| Kansas City, Kansas, United States
|
|-
| Win
| align=center| 5–2
| Micol Di Segni
| Decision (unanimous)
| Dana White's Contender Series 25
| 
| align=center| 3
| align=center| 5:00
| Las Vegas, Nevada, United States
|
|-
| Win
| align=center| 4–2
| Ashley Nichols
| TKO (elbows)
| Invicta FC 31: Jandiroba vs. Morandin
| 
| align=center| 3
| align=center| 1:05
| Kansas City, Missouri, United States
|
|-
| Win
| align=center| 3–2
| Linsey Williams
| Submission (rear-naked choke)
| LFA 38
| 
| align=center| 2
| align=center| 3:18
| Minneapolis, Minnesota, United States
|
|-
| Win
| align=center| 2–2
| Tiffany Masters
| TKO (punches)
| Invicta FC 27: Kaufman vs. Kianzad
| 
| align=center| 2
| align=center| 3:36
| Kansas City, Missouri, United States
|
|-
| Loss
| align=center| 1–2
| Maycee Barber
| Decision (unanimous)
| LFA 22
| 
| align=center| 3
| align=center| 5:00
| Broomfield, Colorado, United States
|
|-
| Loss
| align=center| 1–1
| Sunna Davíðsdóttir
| Decision (unanimous)
| Invicta FC 22: Evinger vs. Kunitskaya II
| 
| align=center| 3
| align=center| 5:00
| Kansas City, Missouri, United States
| 
|-
| Win
| align=center| 1–0
| Heqin Lin
| Decision (unanimous)
| Kunlun Fight MMA 7
| 
| align=center| 3
| align=center| 5:00
| Beijing, China
|
|-

See also
 List of female mixed martial artists

References

External links
 
 

Living people
1994 births
Sportspeople from Denver
Sportspeople from Colorado
American female mixed martial artists
American practitioners of Brazilian jiu-jitsu
Female Brazilian jiu-jitsu practitioners
Strawweight mixed martial artists
Mixed martial artists utilizing Brazilian jiu-jitsu
Kunlun Fight MMA Fighters
Ultimate Fighting Championship female fighters
21st-century American women